1349 Bechuana, provisional designation , is a background asteroid from the outer regions of the asteroid belt, approximately 26 kilometers in diameter. It was discovered on 13 June 1934, by South-African astronomer Cyril Jackson at the Union Observatory in Johannesburg. The asteroid was named for the former Bechuanaland, what is now the Republic of Botswana.

Orbit and classification 

Bechuana is a non-family asteroid from the main belt's background population. It orbits the Sun in the outer asteroid belt at a distance of 2.5–3.5 AU once every 5 years and 3 months (1,912 days; semi-major axis of 3.01 AU). Its orbit has an eccentricity of 0.16 and an inclination of 10° with respect to the ecliptic. The body's observation arc begins with its official discovery observation at Johannesburg in June 1934.

Physical characteristics 

Bechuana has been characterized as both a C-type and X-type asteroid by Pan-STARRS photometric survey. The Collaborative Asteroid Lightcurve Link (CALL) assumes it to be a carbonaceous C-type.

Rotation period 

In December 2010, a rotational lightcurve of Bechuana was obtained from photometric observations by astronomers at the Palomar Transient Factory in California. Lightcurve analysis gave a rotation period of 15.681 hours with a brightness variation of 0.29 magnitude. In January 2011, astronomers Pierre Antonini and Silvano Casulli measured a refined period of 15.692 hours with an amplitude of 0.30.

Poles 

A 2016-published lightcurve, using modeled photometric data from the Lowell Photometric Database, gave a concurring period of 15.6873 hours and determined two spin axis in ecliptic coordinates (λ, β) of (153.0°, 32.0°) and (314.0°, 46.0°).

Diameter and albedo 

According to the surveys carried out by the Japanese Akari satellite and the NEOWISE mission of NASA's Wide-field Infrared Survey Explorer, Bechuana measures between 23.773 and 28.57 kilometers in diameter and its surface has an albedo between 0.150 and 0.2610.

CALL assumes a standard albedo for carbonaceous asteroids of 0.057 and consequently calculates a much larger diameter of 46.30 kilometers based on an absolute magnitude of 10.4.

Naming 

This minor planet was named after the Bechuanaland, a British Protectorate from 1884 to 1966 and what is now the  Republic of Botswana, north of South Africa. The official naming citation was mentioned in The Names of the Minor Planets by Paul Herget in 1955.

References

External links 
 Asteroid Lightcurve Database (LCDB), query form (info )
 Dictionary of Minor Planet Names, Google books
 Asteroids and comets rotation curves, CdR – Observatoire de Genève, Raoul Behrend
 Discovery Circumstances: Numbered Minor Planets (1)-(5000) – Minor Planet Center
 
 

001349
Discoveries by Cyril Jackson (astronomer)
Named minor planets
19340613